Conus sartii is a species of sea snail, a marine gastropod mollusk in the family Conidae, the cone snails, cone shells or cones.

These snails are predatory and venomous. They are capable of "stinging" humans.

Description
The size of the shell attains 25 mm.

Distribution
This marine species occurs off Madagascar.

References

  Korn W., Niederhöfer H.-J. & Blöcher M. (2002 ["2001"]) Conus sartii sp. nov. from Madagascar (Gastropoda: Conidae). La Conchiglia 33(301): 32-40.
 Puillandre N., Duda T.F., Meyer C., Olivera B.M. & Bouchet P. (2015). One, four or 100 genera? A new classification of the cone snails. Journal of Molluscan Studies. 81: 1-23

External links
 To World Register of Marine Species
 Cone Shells - Knights of the Sea
 

sartii
Gastropods described in 2002